The 2014–15 Chicago State Cougars men's basketball team represented Chicago State University during the 2014–15 NCAA Division I men's basketball season. The Cougars, led by fifth year head coach Tracy Dildy, played their home games at the Emil and Patricia Jones Convocation Center and were members of the Western Athletic Conference. They finished the season 8–24, 4–10 in WAC play to finish in a tie for seventh place. They lost in the quarterfinals of the WAC tournament to Seattle.

Roster

Schedule and results

|-
!colspan=9 style="background:#28372F; color:#FFFFFF;"| Non-Conference Regular season

|-
!colspan=9 style="background:#28372F; color:#FFFFFF;"| WAC Regular season

|-
!colspan=9 style="background:#28372F; color:#FFFFFF;"| WAC tournament

References

Chicago State Cougars men's basketball seasons
Chicago State